Cassida panzeri is a species of beetle in the leaf beetle family, found in the Palearctic realm, and in the Honshu province of Japan. The host plants are in the family Asteraceae, and include Arctium lappa, Scorzonera humilis, Taraxacum officinale, Tragopogon pratensis and Cirsium species (including Cirsium arvense and Cirsium vulgare).

References

Cassidinae
Beetles described in 1907
Beetles of Asia
Taxa named by Julius Weise